Scott Young (born May 26, 1965) is a Canadian-British former professional ice hockey defenceman.

Playing career
Between 1989 and 1991, Young played in the American Hockey League for the New Haven Nighthawks, the International Hockey League for the San Diego Gulls and Phoenix Roadrunners, and the East Coast Hockey League for the Knoxville Cherokees. He then had a two-year spell in The Netherlands for the Heerenveen Flyers before moving to the United Kingdom in 1993 where he would spend the next ten seasons. His spell included a five-year stay with the Ayr Scottish Eagles of the Ice Hockey Superleague, where he won the BISL Championship in 1998 and was named into the BISL First All-Star Team that same year. Young was also a member of the Great Britain national team.

Career statistics

Awards and honors

References

External links

 

1965 births
Living people
Ayr Scottish Eagles players
Canadian ice hockey defencemen
Colgate Raiders men's ice hockey players
Dundee Stars players
Ice hockey people from Ontario
Heerenveen Flyers players
Hull Thunder players
Knoxville Cherokees players
Milton Keynes Kings players
New Haven Nighthawks players
Phoenix Roadrunners (IHL) players
San Diego Gulls (IHL) players
Sportspeople from Oakville, Ontario
Teesside Bombers players
Canadian expatriate ice hockey players in England
Canadian expatriate ice hockey players in Scotland
Canadian expatriate ice hockey players in the United States
Canadian expatriate ice hockey players in the Netherlands
Naturalised citizens of the United Kingdom
British expatriate sportspeople in the United States
British expatriate ice hockey people